Fornos is a Portuguese parish, located in the municipality of Santa Maria da Feira. The population in 2011 was 3,397, in an area of 3.14 km2.

References

Freguesias of Santa Maria da Feira